A Touch of Velvet is a studio album by country music singer Jim Reeves with backing from the Anita Kerr Singers. It was released in 1962 on the RCA Victor label (catalog no. LPM-2487). The album was produced by Chet Atkins. It included the No. 2 country single, "Welcome to My World".

In Billboard magazine's annual poll of country and western disc jockeys, it was ranked No. 5 among the "Favorite Country Music LPs" of 1962.

Track listing
Side A
 "Have You Ever Been Lonely (Have You Ever Been Blue)"
 "There's Always Me"
 "Just Walking in the Rain"
 "Be Honest with Me"
 "Welcome to My World"
 "(It's No) Sin"

Side B
 "I Fall to Pieces"
 "Am I That Easy to Forget"
 "Blue Skies"
 "All Dressed Up and Lonely"
 "Wild Rose"
 "I'm a Fool to Care"

References

1962 albums
Jim Reeves albums
RCA Victor albums